The Yasuní-ITT Initiative was a project that attempted to keep over a billion barrels of oil in the ground under the Yasuni National Park, a biosphere reserve in the Ecuadorian Amazon.  The initiative was launched in 2007 by president Rafael Correa which offered a perpetual suspension of oil extraction in part of the Yasuni National Park called Ishpingo-Tambococha-Tiputini (ITT) in return for payments of $3.6 billion from the international community (half of what Ecuador would have realized in revenue from exploiting the resources at 2007 prices). It envisioned the transition to a sustainable economy, using the funds to create jobs in such sectors as renewable energy while respecting the region's biodiversity and social equality. However by 2012 only $200 million had been pledged and by 2013 the plan had abandoned and drilling started in 2016.

The aim of the initiative was to conserve biodiversity, protect indigenous peoples living in voluntary isolation, and avoid the release of CO2 emissions. The Yasuni-ITT Trust Fund was officially launched on 3 August 2010. The reserve had around 846 million barrels or 20% of the country's proven oil reserve.

After receiving pledges totalling $200 million by 2012, the Ecuadorian government announced that it would move forward with the Yasuni-ITT Initiative. However, in July 2013, Ecuador's president Rafael Correa's commission on the Yasuni-ITT Initiative's progress, the commission concluded that economic results were insufficient, leading Correa to scrap the plan on August 15, 2013. , campaign groups were still attempting to save Yasuní-ITT from oil activities but ultimately failed.

History 
The Yasuni-ITT Initiative was launched by president Rafael Correa of Ecuador at the U.N. General Assembly in 2007. The Yasuni-ITT Initiative sought to prevent the drilling of oil in the Ishpingo-Tambococha-Tiputini (ITT) oil field within the Yasuni National Park. The Yasuni National Park, located on the eastern edge of Ecuador, encompasses a section of Ecuador's Amazon Rainforest and is recognized as one of the most bio diverse regions in the world; as well as the home of several indigenous Amazonian tribes.  An initial proposal to promote the sustainable development of the renewable resources of the National Parks in the Amazon rainforest of Ecuador, rather than extracting non-renewable oil resources, was published in 1994 by Luis Fierro. However, the Yasuni National Park is estimated to contain approximately 846 million barrels of crude oil, approximately 20% of the country's proven oil reserves. To prevent the environmental destruction caused as a result of oil exploitation, the government of Ecuador proposed a permanent ban on oil production inside the Ishpingo-Tambococha-Tiputini oil field in exchange for 50% of the value of the reserves, or $3.6 billion over 13 years to be raised from public and private contributions from the international community. By preventing the drilling of oil inside the Ishpingo-Tambococha-Tiputini oil field, the Yasuni-ITT Initiative sought to conserve the biodiversity of the region, protect the indigenous peoples currently living in voluntary isolation inside the Yasuni National Park, and avoid the emission of significant quantities of CO2 caused by oil production.

To administer the funds donated to the Yasuni-ITT Initiative, the Yasuni-ITT Trust Fund was officially launched on 3 August 2010. The Yasuni-ITT Trust Fund was administered by the Multi-Partner Trust Fund of the United Nations Development Programme (UNDP). The Yasuni-ITT Initiative was to be considered an unprecedented victory for the environmental community as the first large-scale carbon abatement project carried out by a developing country with cooperation from the international community. In August 2013, however, Ecuador's President Correa canceled the initiative.

Benefits of the initiative

Preserving biodiversity 
Yasuni National Park is one of the most biologically diverse areas on earth. Scientists have discovered 655 species of trees in one hectare of land in the park, more than the total record of the US and Canada combined. It has been declared a world biosphere reserve by UNESCO. Some 4,000-plant species, 173 species of mammals and 610 bird species live inside the Park. "It contains more documented insect species than any other forest in the world, and is among the most diverse forests in the world for different species of birds, bats, amphibians, epiphytes, and lianas. Yasuní is critical habitat to 23 globally threatened mammal species, including the Giant otter, the Amazonian manatee, Pink river dolphin, Giant anteater, and Amazonian tapir... Ten primate species live in the Yasuní, including the threatened White-bellied spider monkey." Earth Economics has estimated that its environmental benefits would have a net present value of 9.89 billion dollars. It was also estimated that the environmental costs of oil production in the ITT would be at least US$1.25 billion in present terms. This latter estimate includes only the effects of deforestation, the loss of ecotourism potential and the non-timber-related services of the forest, and excludes a number of externalities of oil exploitation like spills, local pollution, and effects on public health.

Currently, there has been some drilling in the Yasuni area, which has caused deforestation, air, and water pollution. Oil roads into the forest have become a magnet for colonization and opened up the park to over-hunting and deforestation. There are hundreds of waste oil "lakes" in the forest.

Avoiding CO2 emissions 
Leaving the oil underground avoids the emission of 410 million metric tons of CO2. Carbon dioxide in Ecuador has led to degradation and deforestation to the ecological system. Contribution from the international community can help to develop reforestation to avoid petroleum energy.

Environmental impacts
Media coverage and legal documentation are limited when it comes to oil spills in the Amazon. Petro Ecuador has been notorious at having more than 400 spills a year. The government needs to do due diligence, to make sure that oil companies change their management and especially their extraction practice to avoid oil spills.

Social, cultural, and political impacts
The main group of individuals that will become most affected is the indigenous groups. Many foreign oil and gas companies have bribed with narcotics and liquor. The Ecuadorian indigenous do not possess the means to fight off against the foreign oil companies.

The history of the protection of indigenous people in voluntary isolation 
Historically the Waorani, a semi-nomadic group of hunter-gatherers, have lived in the Yasuní National Park for centuries.  However, after the introduction of Royal-Dutch-Shell workers in 1930 that lead missionaries to this land, the only remaining part of the Wanorani are the Tagaeri and the Taromenane.  As oil mongers continued to come into their land as the years went on, the Waorani established the "Organization of Waorani Nationalities of Ecuador" (ONHAE) to expand their rights.  The ONHAE requested that the government of Ecuador grant the Waorani legal title over their territory.  They wanted control over their land so that they could bring the harmful oil exploitation in their land to a halt.  However, the government saw the Waorani opposition to oil activities as harmful to the modernization of Ecuador.  Oil companies used the justification that Ecuador's development was dependent on oil extraction to further their projects.  However, as oil companies like Maxus continued to build roads to aid in their extraction efforts the Waorani claimed that the company was "destroying everything in their path: our culture, our territory, and our lives."  Their cry for help in the form of an "oil moratorium" gained the attention of NGOs concerned with the biodiversity of the rainforest, and it led to the Amazonia por la Vida (Amazon for Life), which brought environmental problems in the Amazon to the forefront of the media.  This began the open discourse between the Waorani against oil activities in their land.

Before oil exploitation began, however, the Ecuadorian government enacted the doctrine of terra nullius, a racist doctrine that provided legal justification for Europeans to annex territories that were inhabited by indigenous people.  The terra nullius asserted legal and political rule over the indigenous and gave them no property or political rights.  It claimed that they were "savages" who could not exercise political power over their land. Thus, the land was claimed by Europeans who exercised control over the indigenous populations and began oil extraction without consent or compensation to the local peoples.
In the early 1960s, oil companies ignored local land rights, failed to mitigate pollution/damage to the Amazon, and allowed for the process of colonization of the Amazon to begin.  All of these issues combined stripped indigenous people of large areas of their territory and endangered their cultural and economic way of life.  In their opposition, local residents sought to participate fully in discussions with multi-national oil companies and national governments on the issue.  While this discourse did not blossom fully in the 1960s, by the 1990s the political pressure that oil companies faced completely changed the way things were done.  Oil companies and governments now had to pay attention to the social and environmental impacts of extraction and long-term interests of local communities.  A middle ground between the Waorani way of life and governmental and oil company's interests were created.  To create this middle ground the Waorani learned new languages, traveled to the United States, met with industry and government officials, created new indigenous federations and political practices, engaged with international science, and modified long-standing social and economic practices.  Through these actions a discourse was created, leaving the old one-sided exploitation of the indigenous lands in the past.  Although the Waorani still did not have complete control of their land and their destiny, the middle ground had given them some influence over their fate.  The native people also seek employment in the oil industry, access to oil markets, and long-term investment in health centers, schools, and community development.  However, they struggled to establish good conditions for new projects, such as monitoring environmental pollution, the establishment of clear land rights, and sharing of the profits from oil development.  By ignoring the wants and needs of the native people, oil companies forced them to turn to political resistance as the only way to make themselves heard.  In the 1970s native groups wanted to incorporate concern for damage of the Amazon into the planning and execution of development projects.  They also sought local control over development projects as a way to incorporate sustainable practices in their land.  These concerns were given little attention until the 1980s when the government began to recognize native land claims.  Town-meetings held by the Waorani were run in a consensus style, and although this is a different practice compared to the rest of the world, national governments recognized these meetings as legitimate political proceedings. While there is still much that needs to be done in the way of sustainable oil extraction, the discourse between the local population in the Ecuadorian Amazon has increased dramatically giving them a voice and a say in what happens to their land.

As their influence rose the Waorani were able to stop exploration in two leased oil blocks in Ecuador.  They also pushed the government in 2007 to prohibit oil, gas, and logging activities in the "Zona Intangible", which was 7,580  km2 of Waorani land.  The grounds for this movement included not only contaminations of the Waorani land in the Amazon, but also the diseases, that were decimating the Waorani population, brought in by persons from the developed world. In a lawsuit against Texaco, lawyers pointed to the actual loss of money by oil companies after oil exploitation to prove that sustainable practices on the front end would benefit the company and the land.  In the 1980s the average income per barrel of oil was five dollars, while the cost of reparations for the land were more than six dollars per barrel.  The six dollars only covered local damages, it did not account for climate change and costs of carbon dioxide production, which also required payment for.  These figures prove that indigenous concerns for the land are not only beneficial to the land, but also cost-effective.  The story-line about respecting and preserving the land of the "last free people" is the corner-stone of the ever-changing discourse underlining the Yasuní-ITT project, and is used every time human rights activists claim that isolated groups are affected by new oil activities.

Critical reception and support 
Leonardo DiCaprio and Edward Norton as well as Michael Charles Tobias and Jane Gray Morrison are among the many public figures supporting the Ecuadorian government on its historic proposal to conserve biodiversity, protect human rights, and avoid CO2 emissions.

The former General Secretary of the United Nations, Ban Ki-moon, also supports the Yasuni-ITT.

Closure

Abandonment of Yasuní-ITT Initiative by Ecuadorian government
In July 2013, Correa formed a commission to evaluate the Yasuni-ITT Initiative's progress to date.  The commission concluded that the economic results were not sufficient.  On August 15, Correa scrapped the plan citing poor follow through from the international community.  "The world has failed us", he said, calling the world's richest countries hypocrites who emit most of the world's greenhouse gases while expecting nations like his to sacrifice economic progress for the environment.  Through an executive order, he liquidated the Yasuni-ITT trust fund formally ending the initiative.  During the six-year history of the initiative, only $336 million had been pledged, Correa said, and of that, only $13.3 million had actually been delivered.

On Wednesday September 7, 2016, the Ecuadorian government confirmed the start of drilling activity within the Yasuni-ITT block. Then vice president Jorge Glas led reporters around the drilling site managed by Petroecuador, the country's national oil company. As of July 2016, the whole of the block was estimated to hold around 1.7 billion barrels of oil.

Referendum campaigns 
Despite President Correa's decision to close the Yasuní-ITT Initiative, environmental groups and conservationists are fighting to keep Yasuní-ITT oil-free by forcing a referendum on Correa's plans. This has arisen out of a national law that establishes the possibility of a national referendum taking place on a given subject if a campaign can canvass signatures in favor of such a referendum from 5% of the electorate. In Ecuador, this currently represents just under 600,000 people. In October 2013, shortly after the government approved of Correa's plans and gave the go-ahead to oil exploration in Yasuní-ITT, the anti-exploitation group YASunidos launched a campaign to collect enough signatures to trigger a referendum, with the proposed question: "Do you agree that the government of Ecuador should leave the crude of ITT, known as Block 43, below ground indefinitely?". They were given until early April 2014 to collect the necessary signatures, and as of mid-March they have collected more than 480,000, meaning they are on track to reach their target.

Many analysts and commentators suggest that if a referendum were to take place, it may well be successful, as the Yasuní-ITT Initiative enjoyed very high levels of support before it was axed in August 2013, with as many as 80% in favor of the initiative and more than 66% opposed to the exploitation of the oil. However, Correa remains a very popular president and commands a great amount of influence over public opinion, and he has been putting this to good effect in launching a publicity campaign attempting to convince Ecuadoreans of the supposed benefits of extracting the Yasuní-ITT oil. These include billions of dollars' worth in revenue which Correa promises will be used to invest in Ecuador's poorest areas, including Amazonian regions such as Yasuní. Furthermore, a rival group backing Correa's plans has launched its own campaign to collect the 600,000 signatures necessary to trigger a referendum in favor of the oil's extraction. If both the YASunidos campaign and this second one are successful in collecting enough signatures, forcing a referendum, and achieving a YES vote at the polls, there could follow a scenario of legal confusion over what should happen next.

There have also been allegations of "foul play" by opponents of the YASunidos campaign, including plagiarism of their campaign pamphlets designed to confuse voters and stop YASunidos from collecting enough signatures, and an instance of abduction and assault by government officials against a YASunidos activist.

References

External links 
 Yasuni-ITT 
 Ecuador Allows Oil Drilling in Yasuni National Park, Environment News Service (ENS) August 16, 2013
 Failing of Yasuni-ITT; described in NGC magazine January 2013
 Campaign for the prevention of exploitation of the ITT block in Yasuni National Park
 "Opinion: Yasuní and the New Economics of Climate Change" CNN. Edition: International. August 23, 2010.
 SOS Yasuni
 Documentary film: A Future without Oil (French: Une idée simple et révolutionnaire), 2010; Director: Laetitia Moreau; Production: What's Up Films.
 Documentary film, 2020, director Ryan Killackey: Yasuni Man: a true story about strength, survival and a quest to save home (description & trailer): "Yasuni Man continues its effort to raise awareness around the exploitation of indigenous peoples in the Amazon, biodiversity and habitat loss, and the unsustainable exploitation of non-renewable natural resources."

Huaorani
Environment of Ecuador
Environmental impact of the petroleum industry